Bystrowianidae is a family of chroniosuchian reptiliomorphs from the Permian and Triassic periods.

Phylogeny
Below is the cladogram from Buchwitz et al. (2012) showing the phylogenetic relations of bystrowianids:

References

Chroniosuchians